shoutr  is a mobile application that allows users to transfer data of any kind between Android-powered devices. It works without an internet connection or pre-existing network infrastructure. All that is needed are two or more Android devices equipped with Wi-Fi technology. All data sent with shoutr is protected by WPA2 encryption.

The technology behind shoutr is based on the Wi-Fi capability built into the respective Android device. This is used to connect devices directly: One device opens up a Wi-Fi hotspot; other devices connect to it and get the data - this does not need a Wi-Fi hotspot around.

According to Google Play, shoutr is available for Android devices from Android 2.2 (Froyo) on.

See also 
 AirDrop, a similar platform for iOS smart phones
 Briar (software), and independent copyleft app for Android
 Nearby Share, a similar Google platform for Android smart phones
 Shoutr, a free proprietary Wi-Fi P2P multi-user app for sharing files on Android
 Wi-Fi Direct, a similar technology
 Zapya, a free proprietary file transfer over Wi-Fi app

References

File sharing software
Proprietary software